Andrew McIntosh may refer to:

 Andrew McIntosh, Baron McIntosh of Haringey (1933–2010), British Labour politician
 Andrew McIntosh (physicist)
 Andrew McIntosh (Australian politician) (born 1955), Australian politician
 Andrew McIntosh (cricketer) (born 1980), Papua New Guinean cricketer
 Andrew M. McIntosh, British academic psychiatrist